Trinity College, Kandy, is an independent private school for boys in Kandy Sri Lanka. It was founded in 1872 by British Anglican missionaries of the Church Missionary Society, modelled on British Public school tradition. Trinity offers primary and secondary education, and is a leading private school in Sri Lanka managed by the Anglican Church of Ceylon.

History
 

In 1857 the local Anglican community in Kandy urged the Church Mission Society (CMS) to establish a school for boys in the area. On 16 October 1857 the Rev. John Ireland Jones arrived from England, establishing the Kandy Collegiate School. The school operated for approximately six years. 

In 1872 the CMS sent out the Rev. Richard Collins, the principal of the CMS Syrian College of Travancore to re-open the collegiate school in Kandy. On 18 January 1872, it was re-opened as the Trinity College and Collegiate School, with the Collins as principal  and by the end of that year there were 120 enrolled students. The school library was opened in 1875. Early in 1877 the Collegiate School name was dropped and it simply became Trinity College. Rev. Collins left in 1878 and Thomas Dunn became acting principal of the school. In 1879 the college was affiliated with the University of Calcutta.

In 1880 the Rev. John G. Garrett was appointed as principal of the school and by the following year enrolments had increased to 238 students, with 30 boarders. In 1885 Garrett had to resign due to ill health and was replaced by the Rev. Dr. E. Noel Hodges, formerly the principal of the Noble High School, Machilipatnam. In 1889 Dr. Hodges was appointed as the Anglican Bishop of Travancore and Cochin and his post at Trinity was taken by Rev. Edward John Perry, who had been a master at Merchant Taylors' School. On 2 April 2, 1890, Perry was accidentally shot dead near Alutnuwara, whilst on a visit to the Vedda people in the area. The Rev. J. W. Fall, who was the vice-principal, became the acting principal until the arrival of the Rev. Henry Percy Napier-Clavering, in June 1890. At that time Trinity had 298 students, of whom sixty-three were boarders.

In August 1900 Napier-Clavering resigned to return to England and attend to family matters. He was replaced by Rev. Robert William Ryde, who had previously been the vice-principal at the school from 1895 to 1899 before becoming the principal at St. John's College, Jaffna. Rev. Ryde held this post for a brief two years, leaving in 1902. In 1902 the Rev. J. Carter became the temporary principal followed by a succession of temporary principals, including the Rev. Napier-Clavering and the Rev. A. MacLulich. 

On 5 November 1904, the Rev. Alexander Garden Fraser was appointed as the principal of the school. During Fraser's tenure he transformed a provincial school into a nationally recognised institution. His educational reforms included the introduction of Sinhalese and Tamil into the curriculum and increased its involvement in the local community. He was responsible for a number of building projects, including the Asgiriya Stadium and the Trinity College Chapel. He served continuously as the principal for eighteen years until 1922, his service was only interrupted by two years when he served as an army chaplain with the British Expeditionary Force in France during World War I.

The school was headed from 1925 to 1935 by Canon John McLeod Campbell (who later served as chaplain to the Royal Family). McLeod Campbell retired in 1935  and was replaced by Rev. Robert Stopford. Stopford was the last English-born principal of the school, remaining in the position for five years. He later became Bishop of London. During his tenure, the college hall was gifted by a former student, A. H. T. De Soysa. In 1940 the Church Missionary Society  handed control of the school to an independent board of governors.

The board's first appointment was C. E. Simithraaratchy, the first old boy and Ceylonese-born principal, who ran the school from 1941 until 1951, including the Second World War years. His successor was Norman Sydney Walter, from 1952 to 1957. Walter returned to England and later became the headmaster of Loughborough Grammar School. The responsibility for the school was then passed onto Cedric James Oorloff (formerly the principal of Wesley College, Colombo) between 1957 and 1968. In 1968 E. Lionel Fernando became the second former student to be appointed as the school's principal. His tenure ran for nine years, until 1977. At which time W. G. Wickremasinghe (the principal of Carey College, Colombo) was appointed as principal of the school. He was followed by Lt. Col. Leonard M. De Alwis in 1988 who was responsible for the Pallekele Rugby Stadium. He administered the school until 1998 and resigned to take on the role as the inaugural principal of Springfield College, Kandy. De Alwis was succeeded by Warren Ranjithan Breckenridge. Breckenridge was a former student at Trinity and a professor of zoology at Peradeniya University, a post he held until 1998 when he was appointed the principal of Trinity. Following Breckenridge's retirement the college in 2003 appointed Roderick Gilbert as the school's principal. Gilbert, an Indian-born Englishman, who was previously the principal at the Hebron School in Ootacamund, India. Brig. Udaya Aryaratne  was the principal from 2008 to 2015 and was succeeded by former vice principal Colin B. Ratnayake, as the acting principal until the appointment of Andrew Fowler-Watt in 2016.

World War I

Trinity College and three other English missionary schools, namely S. Thomas' College, Mount Lavinia, Kingswood College, Kandy, and Royal College, Colombo, had students who served in the first world war. Among the Trinitians, Aelian Perera was awarded a commission with the Durham Light Infantry and J. W. S. Bartholomeusz received the Croix de Guerre of the first class for his valour. 

The World War I memorial of a German machine gun stands overlooking the quadrangle in front of the Alison house. The memorial is based on traditional Sri Lankan architecture and was unveiled on behalf of King George V on 16 October 1919 by Sir William Henry Manning, the Governor of Ceylon. The memorial commemorates the service of 65 former students and staff from Trinity, including principal, Rev. A. G. Fraser, who fought in the First World War. 

The Governor in his commendatory tribute stated:
“To me, Trinity College has a record and a Roll of Honour of which it may be justly proud. I find that 65 masters, men and boys gave their services overseas during the war and of these 65, there were no fewer than 33 casualties – 13 killed, 18 wounded, and two taken prisoner by the Germans. Now that is 50% of the number that proceeded to the battlefront. It is a record, I repeat again of which Trinity College may well be proud of – a record, I am sure you will agree with me, which any battalion, any regiment, any unit of His Majesty’s service would be proud of.”

The centre of the memorial is a Maschinengewehr 08, which was captured from an enemy encampment. The machine gun was the first noteworthy war trophy gifted by the King to Ceylon. Trinity was the first school outside the United Kingdom to be so honoured.

Principals of Trinity

School song and hymn
The school song, "The Best School of All", was adapted from a poem composed by Sir Henry Newbolt in 1889 as a song for Old Boys of Clifton College in Bristol - his alma mater. The tune of the school song was composed by Lawrence Arthur Adamson, headmaster of Wesley College, Melbourne in 1907. 

The words of the school hymn were composed by Walter Stanley Senior and are sung to the hymn tune, "Bishopgarth". Senior was the vice-principal at the college for ten years (1906–1916), he also deputised as acting principal for a short period in the absence of Alexander Fraser.

College crest

Awards

Ryde Gold Medal
The Ryde Gold Medal is awarded each year to the "best all-round boy" at Trinity. The Ryde Gold Medal is the highest honour that the school can bestow. It is awarded on the result of a secret ballot conducted among the senior boys and the staff whose votes, together with that of the principal, each count as one. While this system makes deadlock possible, it is only on four occasions that the medal has not been awarded as a result of the three votes going to three different people. The medal cannot be won more than once.

The Ryde Gold Medal was first presented in 1908 to John Andrew, but he was not the first boy in the history of the school to be adjudged the best all-rounder. Historical records show that such a prize has been awarded as early as 1894. The Ryde Gold Medal is named after R. W. Ryde, a former principal of Trinity (1900–1902).

Notable winners of the Ryde Gold Medal include Dr Jayantha Dhanapala (1956), the former Under Secretary-General of the UN and senior special advisor to presidents Chandrika Bandaranaike Kumaratunga and Mahinda Rajapakse, former Sri Lankan Foreign Minister Lakshman Kadirgamar (1949), former vice president and CIO of the World Bank; M.V. Muhsin (1962), first Ceylonese IGP and Ambassador Sir Richard Aluwihare (1915) and Sri Lankan Cricket Captain Kumar Sangakkara (1996).

Trinity Lion
The Trinity Lion is the most prestigious award a sportsman can achieve at Trinity. Rugby Lions were awarded in 1915, to A. Halangoda and R. Ondaatje. Since then there have been 129 Rugby Lionsmen (until 2004). Notable awardees of Trinity Lions include former Sri Lankan Foreign Minister, Lakshman Kadirgamar; former Lieutenant General Denzil Kobbekaduwa: Sri Lankan Cricketers Kumar Sangakkara, Ravi Ratnayeke, Olympic Silver Medalist Duncan White and former major general and Ambassador Niranjan A Ranasinghe. There has been one Triple Lion in Trinity's history which is Thushara Weerasuriya who achieved this feat in 1986 in Rugby, Cricket, and Athletics.

Day and Boarding Houses

Trinity College rose into prominence as a Boarding School since its inception in 1872. The boarding system got referred to as the “Backbone of college”. 
Often, well to do parents from all around Ceylon, the British Empire, and the world sent their children to the Trinity boarding. Royal families in Uganda, Gold Coast (Ghana), Brunei and Maldives, to respectable communities in China and the Middle East, boarded their children at Trinity in the days of old. 
 
The senior school students are divided into five houses. Their names are derived from past principals and teachers of the college. There are three boarding houses, however, due to low numbers of boarders they collectively compete as the Central Boarding House. The houses are led by House Captains, competing in all major games to win the inter-house competitions.

Central Boarding House

 Napier House

 Colours: Red and White 
 The first official Senior Boarding House was started in 1898 and constructed by Rev H. P. Napier-Clavering and later named after him as Napier House. The UNESCO declared Napier house as a conserved structure within the world heritage city of Kandy.

 Alison House

 Colours: Blue and White
 On 7 June 1909, the foundation stone of Alison house was laid by Mrs Fraser. Alison house was designed by Norman S. Campbell and was constructed by Messrs. Walker, Sons & Co. Ltd. The opening ceremony of the Alison House took place on 17 December 1909 in the presence of Ernest Arthur Copleston D. D. Bishop of Colombo. The Governor, Sir Henry Edward McCallum, opened the Laboratories by unlocking the main door with a silver key handed to him by the principal, Rev. A. G. Fraser. The new dormitory got named after Alison Watson, the daughter of Mr William Watson of Newcastle, whom Fraser appointed as honorary secretary and treasurer of the Trinity College Extension Fund in Great Britain. 
 Ryde House

 Colours: Black and Yellow
 Ryde House got opened as the 3rd boarding house of Trinity in 1911, during the tenure of Alexander Garden Fraser. Ryde house got named after Robert William Ryde - the sixth principal of Trinity College.

Houses of Day Scholars

 Garret House
Colours: Green
Established: 1910 (named after the third principal, Rev. John Garrett)

 Lemuel House
 Colours: Blue
 Established: 1954 (named after C. N. Lemuel, a long-serving teacher at Trinity College)

 Oorloff House
 Colours: Maroon
 Established :  (named after the thirteenth principal, Cedric Oorloff)

 Simithraaratchy House
 Colours: Yellow
 Established : (named after the eleventh principal, C. E. Simithraaratchy)

The Junior Boarding
 
The junior boarding accommodates students from Grades 4 to 7. 
In the past, 5-year-olds got housed in the matron’s dormitory from where they went to the Junior School Boarding Houses, named after former principals Collins, Hodges and Perry. Between the junior and senior houses, the boarders got housed in a dormitory referred to as Squealary, which got further divided into Junior, Senior and Super. And within these houses, they had separate sections named after three well-known British Public Schools, Eton, Harrow and Rugby. Currently, the boarding does not issue admission to students below fourth grade.

Alumni

See also
 Choir of Trinity College, Kandy
 Mahela-Sanga Challenge Trophy
 Bradby Shield Encounter
 Trinity-Antonian Cricket Encounter
 Hillwood College

References

Notes

Further reading
 Valesco L O Reimann (1922). A history of Trinity College, Kandy. Madras: Diocesan Press

External links 
Trinity College Kandy Official Website

 
1872 establishments in Ceylon
Anglican schools in Sri Lanka
Boarding schools in Sri Lanka
Boys' schools in Sri Lanka
Educational institutions established in 1872
Private schools in Sri Lanka
Schools in Kandy